602 (City of Glasgow) Squadron is a Royal Auxiliary Air Force squadron. Originally formed in 1925 as a light bomber squadron, its role changed in 1938 to army co-operation and in 1939 to that of a fighter squadron.

During the Second World War, the squadron flew Spitfires and took part in the Battle of Britain. After the war, the squadron was reinstated as a fighter squadron within the Royal Auxiliary Air Force, until all these units disbanded in March 1957.

Reformed on 1 July 2006, the Squadron assumed the ISTAR mission support role formerly held by the Mission Support Element (MSE) of 603 (City of Edinburgh) Squadron. In this role the squadron provided flight operations and intelligence support to the RAF at home and overseas, first from Edinburgh before returning to its home city of Glasgow in August 2008.

The squadron underwent a transformation between 2012 and 2014 as it took on more diverse branches and trades and moved under the command of AOC 1 Group, reporting through the UK Joint Force Air Component and Headquarters 1 Group Reserves. At the end of 2014 the squadron moved its headquarters to the Reserve Centre in the King's Park area on the south side of Glasgow. It was later confirmed as a 1 Group General Service Support (GSS) Squadron and, along with the other 1 Group GSS Squadrons, moved from auspices of the UK Joint Force Air Component to sit under the 1* Commandant Air & Space Warfare Centre.

Formation and early years
The squadron was formed at RAF Renfrew on 15 September 1925 as a light bomber squadron in the Auxiliary Air Force, and initially equipped with Airco DH.9As. These were replaced by Fairey Fawns in 1927, Westland Wapitis in 1929, Hawker Harts in 1934 and finally Hawker Hinds in 1936.

The squadron continued in the light bomber role until 1 November 1938 when it was redesignated as an Army Co-operation unit. This did not last long, and on 14 January 1939 the squadron became a fighter squadron. It received Hawker Hectors in November, but was re-equipped with Gloster Gauntlets on conversion to a fighter role. These were short-lived, as Spitfires arrived in May 1939.

Second World War
Like 603 (City of Edinburgh) Squadron, 602 Squadron spent the early part of the war and Battle of Britain on defensive duties in Scotland. In August 1940, it moved south to join the battle, returning to Scotland in December.  It moved south again in July 1941, remaining for a year before returning north. Another move came in January 1943, this time to the southwest, where in April it joined the newly forming 2nd Tactical Air Force. It briefly returned to Scotland from January to March 1944, when it returned south prior to taking part in the invasion of Europe.

From the end of June 1944, it operated from advance airfields in Normandy following the Army's advance into Belgium until September, when it returned from Antwerp to the UK. From RAF Coltishall flying Spitfire XVIs it carried out operations against V2 sites in the Netherlands over an area ranging from The Hook to Den Helder, until disbanding on 15 May 1945 at Coltishall.

Among No. 602's pilots was Raymond Baxter, later to become well known on television as a presenter of the BBC TV series Tomorrow's World. Pierre Clostermann served as a pilot officer in the squadron in 1943 and 1944.

Post-war
With the reactivation of the Royal Auxiliary Air Force, No 602 was reformed on 10 May 1946 at RAF Abbotsinch as a day fighter squadron.  It was initially equipped with Spitfire F.14s and later with F.21s and F.22s, until January 1951 when Vampire FB.5s were received.  It also acquired some F.3s in August 1953, which it flew alongside the FB.5s until February 1954.  FB.9s arrived in November 1954 and the squadron continued to fly both types (FB.5 and FB.9s) until, along with all the flying units of the RAuxAF, it was disbanded on 10 March 1957.

Present role
As part of the new Royal Air Force Reserves umbrella organisation encompassing both the RAuxAF and RAFR, No 602 Squadron was reformed on 1 July 2006 when the mission support element of 603 (City of Edinburgh) Sqn was separated to form a new unit. As detailed above, it first provided operational support to the RAF Air Traffic Management Force, in the UK as well as to other deployed locations as needed before transforming as part of No 1 Group to become a General Service Support Squadron with approximately 20 branches and trades. The Squadron Mission is to generate, develop, sustain and retain trained volunteer Reservists prepared to deploy within the UK and overseas in support of the RAF. Since 2012 some 39 individual deployments have included support to the RAF as far north as RAF Lossiemouth and as far south as the National Air Traffic Control Centre Swanwick as well as many other units in the UK. Additionally, personnel have deployed to Cyprus, Iraq, Qatar, the Falkland Islands, Malaysia and Singapore, Gibraltar and Oman.

The Squadron trains ab initio recruits in the basics of RAF service before they go on to specialise in their chosen branch or trade. The Squadron also recruits ex-Regular Subject Matter Experts (SME) who bring a huge range of skills which can be deployed in support of the Whole Force with little or no additional training.

Moray Flight of No. 602 Squadron was established in 2013 at RAF Lossiemouth and staffed entirely with SMEs to support NATO maritime patrol aircraft and the UK Maritime Air Operations Centre when deployed to the airfield. The unit is also supporting the introduction of the Boeing P-8A Poseidon at Lossiemouth. Moray Flight detach from 602 Squadron and become part of RAF Lossiemouth over late 2020 and early 2021.

Aircraft operated

Commanding officers

Squadron airfields

References

Notes

Bibliography

 (republished in 1969 by Coronet, 1991 by Wingham Press and last in 2004 by Crécy Publishing; Autobiographical 1941–43).

External links

 602 RAUXAF website
 602 Squadron Museum Association
 602 (City of Glasgow) Squadron Museum
 History of 602 Squadron on RAF website
 Present 602 Squadron on RAF website
 History of No.'s 600–604 Squadrons at RAF Web
 Aircraft and markings of No. 602 Squadron on Rafweb
 602 Squadron in the Battle of Britain

602 Squadron
Fighter squadrons of the Royal Air Force in World War II
RAF squadrons involved in the Battle of Britain
Military units and formations established in 1925